Sophie Witt (born 12 November 2002) is a German professional golfer and member of the Ladies European Tour. As an amateur she won the 2020 European Girls' Team Championship.

Amateur career
Witt started playing golf in 2008 and is based at Golf Club Hubbelrath near Düsseldorf. Her mentors include fellow Hubbelrathian Sandra Gal and footballer Lars Bender, whom she met at a pro-am.

Witt joined the German National Team in 2018, and won the bronze at the 2018 European Young Masters with the mixed German team. She finished tied 4th at the 2018 Irish Girls U18 Open Stroke Play Championship at Roganstown Golf Club, five strokes behind winner Kajsa Arwefjäll.

In 2020, Witt won the German National Girls Championship (U18) at Fürstlicher Golf Club Oberschwaben. She also won the 2020 European Girls' Team Championship in Hrubá Borša, Slovakia together with Charlotte Back, Chiara Horder and Paula Schulz-Hanssen. In the final against Sweden Witt halved her game against Meja Örtengren for a final scoreline of 2.5 to 0.5 in Germany's favor.

Professional career
Witt turned professional in early 2022 after finishing tied 12th at the LET Q-School, which earned her a spot on the 2022 Ladies European Tour. Her first tournament as a professional was the Magical Kenya Ladies Open, where she made the cut.

Amateur wins
2017 GVNRW-Ranglistenturnier 1
2018 GVNRW-Ranglistenturnier 1
2020 German National Girls Championship

Source:

Team appearances
Amateur
European Young Masters (representing Germany): 2018
European Girls' Team Championship (representing Germany): 2019, 2020 (winners)
European Ladies' Team Championship (representing Germany): 2021

Source:

References

External links

German female golfers
Ladies European Tour golfers
People from Mettmann (district)
Sportspeople from Düsseldorf (region)
2002 births
Living people
21st-century German women